Outsider art is art made by self-taught or supposedly naïve artists with typically little or no contact with the conventions of the art worlds. In many cases, their work is discovered only after their deaths. Often, outsider art illustrates extreme mental states, unconventional ideas, or elaborate fantasy worlds.

The term outsider art was coined in 1972 as the title of a book by art critic Roger Cardinal. It is an English equivalent for art brut ("raw art" or "rough art"), a label created in the 1940s by French artist Jean Dubuffet to describe art created outside the boundaries of official culture. Dubuffet focused particularly on art by those on the outside of the established art scene, using as examples psychiatric hospital patients, hermits, and spiritualists.

Outsider art has emerged as a successful art marketing category; an annual Outsider Art Fair has taken place in New York since 1993, and there are at least two regularly published journals dedicated to the subject. The term is sometimes misapplied as a catch-all marketing label for art created by people who are outside the mainstream "art world" or "art gallery system", regardless of their circumstances or the content of their work. A more specific term, "outsider music", was later adapted for musicians.

Art of the mentally ill 

Interest in the art of the mentally ill, along with that of children and the makers of "peasant art", was first demonstrated by "Der Blaue Reiter" group: Wassily Kandinsky, August Macke, Franz Marc, Alexej von Jawlensky, and others. What the artists perceived in the work of these groups was an expressive power born of their perceived lack of sophistication. Examples of this were reproduced in 1912 in the first and only issue of their publication, Der Blaue Reiter Almanac. During World War I, Macke was killed at Champagne in 1914 and Marc was killed at Verdun in 1916; the gap left by these deaths was to some extent filled by Paul Klee, who continued to draw inspiration from these 'primitives'.

Interest in the art of insane asylum inmates continued to grow in the 1920s. In 1921, Dr. Walter Morgenthaler published his book Ein Geisteskranker als Künstler (A Psychiatric Patient as Artist) about Adolf Wölfli, a psychotic mental patient in his care. Wölfli had spontaneously taken up drawing, and this activity seemed to calm him. His most outstanding work was an illustrated epic of 45 volumes in which he narrated his own imaginary life story. With 25,000 pages, 1,600 illustrations, and 1,500 collages, it is a monumental work. Wölfli also produced a large number of smaller works, some of which were sold or given as gifts. His work is on display at the Adolf Wölfli Foundation in the Museum of Fine Art, Bern.

A defining moment was the publication of Bildnerei der Geisteskranken (Artistry of the Mentally Ill) in 1922, by Hans Prinzhorn. This was the first formal study of psychiatric works, based upon a compilation of thousands of examples from European institutions. The book and the art collection gained much attention from avant-garde artists of the time, including Paul Klee, Max Ernst, and Jean Dubuffet.

People with some formal artistic training as well as well-established artists are not immune from mental illness, and may also be institutionalized. For example, William Kurelek, later awarded the Order of Canada for his artistic life work, as a young man was admitted to the Maudsley Psychiatric Hospital where he was treated for schizophrenia. In the hospital he painted, producing The Maze, a dark depiction of his tortured youth. He was transferred from the Maudsley to Netherne Hospital from November 1953 to January 1955, to work with Edward Adamson (1911–1996), a pioneer of art therapy, and creator of the Adamson Collection.

Jean Dubuffet and art brut 

French artist Jean Dubuffet was particularly struck by Bildnerei der Geisteskranken and began his own collection of such art, which he called art brut or raw art. In 1948 he formed the Compagnie de l'Art Brut along with other artists, including André Breton and Claude Lévi-Strauss. The collection he established became known as the Collection de l'art brut and the curator was Slavko Kopač for almost three decades. It contains thousands of works and is now permanently housed in Lausanne, Switzerland.

Dubuffet characterized art brut as:

Those works created from solitude and from pure and authentic creative impulses – where the worries of competition, acclaim and social promotion do not interfere – are, because of these very facts, more precious than the productions of professionals. After a certain familiarity with these flourishings of an exalted feverishness, lived so fully and so intensely by their authors, we cannot avoid the feeling that in relation to these works, cultural art in its entirety appears to be the game of a futile society, a fallacious parade.
— Jean Dubuffet, "Place à l'incivisme" (December 1987 – February 1988).  Dubuffet's writing on art brut was the subject of a noted program at the Art Club of Chicago in the early 1950s.

Dubuffet argued that 'culture', that is mainstream culture, managed to assimilate every new development in art, and by doing so took away whatever power it might have had. The result was to asphyxiate genuine expression. Art brut was his solution to this problem – only art brut was immune to the influences of culture, immune to being absorbed and assimilated, because the artists themselves were not willing or able to be assimilated.

Dubuffet’s championing of Art Brut would not last long. Scholars argue Dubuffet’s distaste for the mainstream art world helped ensure that art brut and the Compagnie de l'Art Brut would not survive on a commercial basis. Dubuffet would kill art brut as he defined it in his quest for its authenticity. Three years after the Compagnie de l'Art Brut was formed, Dubuffet dissolved it, caving to form the more conventional Collection de l'art brut afterward.

Cultural context 
The interest in "outsider" practices among twentieth-century artists and critics can be seen as part of a larger emphasis on the rejection of established values within the modernist art milieu. The early part of the 20th century gave rise to Cubism and the Dada, Constructivist and Futurist movements in art, all of which involved a dramatic movement away from cultural forms of the past. Dadaist Marcel Duchamp, for example, abandoned "painterly" technique to allow chance operations a role in determining the form of his works, or simply to recontextualize existing "ready-made" objects as art. Mid-century artists, including Pablo Picasso, looked outside the traditions of high culture for inspiration, drawing from the artifacts of "primitive" societies, the unschooled art made by children, and vulgar advertising graphics. Dubuffet's championing of the art brut – of the insane and others at the margins of society – is yet another example of avant-garde art challenging established cultural values. As with analysis of these other art movements, current discourse indicates art brut is innately tied to primitivism due to its similarity in its borrowing of personal "de-patriation" and exoticization of familiar yet alien forms.

Terminology 

A number of terms are used to describe art that is loosely understood as "outside" of official culture.  Definitions of these terms vary and overlap.  The editors of Raw Vision, a leading journal in the field, suggest that "Whatever views we have about the value of controversy itself, it is important to sustain creative discussion by way of an agreed vocabulary". Consequently, they lament the use of "outsider artist" to refer to almost any untrained artist. "It is not enough to be untrained, clumsy or naïve. Outsider Art is virtually synonymous with Art Brut in both spirit and meaning, to that rarity of art produced by those who do not know its name."

Art Brut: Coined by Jean Dubuffet, the term translated literally from French means "raw art".  'Raw' is analogous in that it has not been through the academic 'cooking' process: i.e. the world of art schools, galleries, and museums. Dubuffet’s original definition pertains strictly to the ‘raw art’ created by the autodidactic and shunned fringes of society. 
Folk art: Folk art originally suggested crafts and decorative skills associated with peasant communities in Europe – though presumably it could equally apply to any indigenous culture. It has broadened to include any product of practical craftsmanship and decorative skill – everything from chain-saw animals to hub-cap buildings. A key distinction between folk and outsider art is that folk art typically embodies traditional forms and social values, where outsider art stands in some marginal relationship to society's mainstream.
Intuitive art/Visionary art: Raw Vision Magazines preferred general terms for outsider art. It describes them as deliberate umbrella terms. However, visionary art, unlike other definitions here can often refer to the subject matter of the works, which includes images of a spiritual or religious nature. Intuitive art is probably the most general term available. Intuit: The Center for Intuitive and Outsider Art based in Chicago operates a museum dedicated to the study and exhibition of intuitive and outsider art.  The American Visionary Art Museum in Baltimore, Maryland is dedicated to the collection and display of visionary art.
Marginal art/Art singulier: Essentially the same as Neuve Invention; refers to artists on the margins of the art world.
Naïve art: Another term commonly applied to untrained artists who aspire to "normal" artistic status, i.e. they have a much more conscious interaction with the mainstream art world than do outsider artists.
Neuve invention: Used to describe artists who, although marginal, have some interaction with mainstream culture. They may be doing art part-time for instance. The expression was coined by Dubuffet too; strictly speaking, it refers only to a special part of the Collection de l'art brut.
Visionary environments: Buildings and sculpture parks built by visionary artists – ranging from decorated houses to large areas incorporating a large number of individual sculptures with a tightly associated theme. Examples include Watts Towers by Simon Rodia, Buddha Park and Sala Keoku by Bunleua Sulilat, and The Palais idéal by Ferdinand Cheval.

Notable outsider artists

See also

 
 
 
:Category: Outsider artists

References

Further reading

Bandyopadhyay, S. and I. Jackson, The Collection, the Ruin and the Theatre: architecture, sculpture and landscape in Nek Chand's Rock Garden, Chandigarh Liverpool, Liverpool University Press, 2007.
Greg Bottoms, I Colori dell'Apocalisse – Viaggi nell'outsider art, Odoya, Bologna 2009 
Greg Bottoms, The Colorful Apocalypse: Journeys in Outsider Art, Chicago: University of Chicago Press, 2007 
Roger Cardinal, Art Brut. In: Dictionary of Art, Vol. 2, London, 1996, p. 515–516.
Marc Decimo, Les Jardins de l'art brut, Les presses du réel, Dijon (France), 2007.
 Turhan Demirel, "Outsider Bilderwelten", Bettina Peters Verlag, 2006, 
Jean Dubuffet: L’Art brut préféré aux arts culturels [1949](=engl in: Art brut. Madness and Marginalia, special issue of Art & Text, No. 27, 1987, p. 31–33).
Hal Foster, Blinded Insight: On the Modernist Reception of the Art of The Mentally Ill. In: October, No. 97, Summer 2001, pp. 3–30.
Michael D. Hall and Eugene W. Metcalf, eds., The Artist Outsider: Creativity and the Boundaries of Culture Washington D.C.: Smithsonian Institution Scholarly Press, 1993. 
Deborah Klochko and John Turner, eds., Create and Be Recognized: Photography on the Edge, San Francisco: Chronicle Books, 2004.
John M. MacGregor, The Discovery of the Art of the Insane. Princeton, Oxford, 1989.
David Maclagan, Outsider Art: From the margins to the marketplace, London: Reaktion books, 2009.
John Maizels, Raw Creation art and beyond, Phaidon Press Limited, London, 1996.
John Maizels (ed.), Outsider Art Sourcebook. Raw Vision, Watford, 2009. 
Lucienne Peiry, Art brut: The Origins of Outsider Art, Paris: Flammarion, 2001.
 Lucienne Peiry (ed.), "Collection de l'Art Brut, Lausanne", Skira Flammarion, 2012.
Lyle Rexer, How to Look at Outsider Art, New York:Abrams, 2005.
Colin Rhodes, Outsider Art: Spontaneous Alternatives, London: Thames and Hudson, 2000.
Rubin, Susan Goldman.  (March 9, 2004).  Art Against the Odds: From Slave Quilts to Prison Paintings.  Publisher: Crown Books for Young Readers. 
Michel Thévoz, Art brut, New York, 1975.
Maurice Tuchman and Carol Eliel, eds. Parallel Visions. Modern Artists and Outsider Art. Exhb. cat. Los Angeles County Museum of Art, Los Angeles, 1992.
 Bianca Tosatti, Arte e psichiatria. Uno sguardo sottile, (in collaboration with Giorgio Bedoni), Mazzotta, Milano, 2000.
Bianca Tosatti, Les Fascicules de l'Art brut', un saggio sull'artista Antonio dalla Valle,2007.
Allen S. Weiss, Shattered Forms, Art Brut, Phantasms, Modernism, State University of New York, Albany, 1992.
Self Taught Artists of the 20th Century: An American Anthology San Francisco: Chronicle Books, 1998
 Daniel Wojcik, Outsider Art: Visionary Worlds and Trauma. University Press of Mississippi, 2016.

External links 

Jeanine Taylor Folk Art – Purveyor of Outsider Art
Raw Vision Magazine – International art magazine devoted to outsider art
 Gricha-rosov.com – Rich database and presentation of international outsider artists (in French language, but has extensive illustrations)
 Outsider Artists in the Collection of Museum of Naive and Marginal Art (MNMA) Jagodina Serbia 
 Russian outsider art from the Bogemskaja-Turchin collection 
Outsider Art news, wire, and announcements
Collection: "Folk, Self-Taught, Amateur, and Visionary Art" at the University of Michigan Museum of Art

 
Visual arts genres
Art Informel and Tachisme
1970s neologisms